This is a list of the National Register of Historic Places listings in Lancaster, Pennsylvania.

This is intended to be a complete list of the properties and districts on National Register of Historic Places in the city of Lancaster, Pennsylvania, United States. The locations of National Register properties and districts for which the latitude and longitude coordinates are included below, may be seen in a Google map.

There are 207 properties and districts listed on the National Register in Lancaster County.  The city of Lancaster is the location of 57 of these properties and districts; they are listed here, while the 151 properties and districts in the other parts of the county are listed separately.  One property straddles the Lancaster city limits and appears on both lists.  Another two sites are further designated as National Historic Landmarks.  Yet another property was formerly listed but has been removed.

Current listings

|}

Former listing

|}

References 

Lancaster

Lancaster, Pennsylvania